Zamin-e Siah (also Romanized as Zamīn-e Sīāh and Zamīn-e Seyāh) is a village in Ashkara Rural District, Fareghan District, Hajjiabad County, Hormozgan Province, Iran. At the 2006 census, its population was 161, comprising 43 families.

References 

Populated places in Hajjiabad County